Mirador del Cretaci is a paleontological site in Catalonia, Spain. Mainly found at the site are fossils of dinosaur footprints, eggshell fragments and bone fragments, although the partial skeleton of the sebecid crocodyliform Ogresuchus is also known from this site.

History
The site was not identified until the mid-20th century when a group of French, Dutch and German scientists traveled to the area to study the geology of this region. Sometime before their arrival in the region, the area had been partially looted and some of the looted fossils ended up in the collections of museums around the world - the rest were probably sold on a black market. The Coll de Nargó Dinosaur Museum (Dinosfera) was eventually built to house the fossils found at Mirador del Cretaci. The site was vandalised in 2015 but was restored by 2019.

References 

Paleontological sites of Europe
 
Paleontology in Spain
Upper Cretaceous Series of Europe